John Bottomley (September 17, 1960 – April 6, 2011) was a Canadian singer-songwriter.

He started in music in the early 1980s with the band Tulpa, which also included his brother Chris, and launched a solo career in 1990 with his solo debut album Library of the Sun. He followed up with his second album, Songs with the Ornamental Hermits, in 1992, and won the Juno Award for Most Promising Male Vocalist the following year.

His most successful album, 1995's Blackberry, spawned the Top 40 hits "You Lose and You Gain" and "Long Way to Go".

Bottomley died in 2011 in Brackendale, British Columbia. The coroner's report concluded that Bottomley killed himself and a family spokesperson confirmed that he had been suffering from clinical depression.

Discography

Albums

Singles

References

1960 births
2011 suicides
Canadian singer-songwriters
Suicides in British Columbia
Musicians from Toronto
Juno Award for Breakthrough Artist of the Year winners
Canadian folk rock musicians
20th-century Canadian male singers
21st-century Canadian male singers